The South Pars/North Dome field is a natural-gas condensate field located in the Persian Gulf. It is by far the world's largest natural gas field, with ownership of the field shared between Iran and Qatar. On the list of natural gas fields it has almost as much recoverable reserves as all the other fields combined. It has significant geostrategic influence.

Field geology
Each formation is divided into two different reservoir layers, separated by impermeable barriers. The field consists of four independent reservoir layers K1, K2, K3, and K4.

The K1 and K3 units are mainly composed of dolomites and anhydrites, while K2 and K4, which constitute major gas reservoirs, comprise limestone and dolomite. A massive anhydrite (the Nar member) separates the K4 from the underlying K5 unit which has poor reservoir qualities. The gross pay zone in the South Pars field is approximately 450 m thick, extending from depths of approximately 2750 to 3200 m. Reservoir strata dip gently to the NE. The average thickness of the reservoir units declines from South Pars (some  ) to North field. As in other reservoir structures in neighboring areas, the reservoir in the Qatar Arch is cut by a set of NNW-SSE trending faults. Diagenesis has a major effect on reservoir quality of the field.

The field is a part of the N-trending Qatar Arch structural feature that is bounded by the Zagros fold and thrust belt to the north and northeast.

In the field, gas accumulation is mostly limited to the Permian–Triassic stratigraphic units. These units known as the Kangan–Dalan Formations constitute very extensive natural gas reservoirs in the field and Persian Gulf area, which composed of carbonate–evaporite series also known as the Khuff Formation.

Permian–Early Triassic has been divided into Faraghan (Early Permian), Dalan (Late Permian) and Kangan (Early Triassic) Formations.

Reserves

According to International Energy Agency (IEA), the combined structure is the world's largest gas field.

Table 1 - South Pars/North Field gas reserves

Note: 1 km³ = 1,000,000,000 m³ = 1 Billion m³ = 1 Trillion Liters

However, since the field is a common field and the reservoir is highly homogenous, the ultimate recoverable reserves of each country may vary from this technical assessment which only considers the static data and does not include rate of gas migration. So, it is better to say that the ultimate recoverable reserves of each country would be a factor of cumulative gas production by each of them.

Reserve uncertainties
In 2005, QatarEnergy became worried the North Dome's reserves were being developed too quickly, which could reduce reservoir pressure and possibly damage its long-term production potential. In early 2005, the government placed a moratorium on additional development projects at the North Dome pending a study of the field's reservoirs. This assessment is not expected to end until after 2009, meaning new projects are unlikely to be signed before 2010. However, this did not affect projects approved or underway before the moratorium.

The 2005 moratorium by Qatar and the subsequent extension of that raised some questions about the actual proven reserves in Qatari side of the field. There was some news in 2006 that ConocoPhillips drilled unexpectedly dry holes in the North Field and this event was at least a partial catalyst for a revamped perspective on the North field structure and potential. Further supporting evidence for skepticism about the real scale of Qatari's reserves came from the 2008 exploration round in Qatar to target exploration of gas in the pre-Khuff formation. Even one of the blocks is exactly located beneath the North Dome Field.

On 29 October 2007, Qatargas CEO Faisal Al Suwaidi stated that the 5-year moratorium on new North Field gas development projects, imposed in 2005, could be extended to 2011 or 2012. The exploration moratorium was lifted by Qatar in April 2017 with the announcement of a new gas project in the southern part of the field.

South Pars development

The South Pars Field was discovered in 1990 by National Iranian Oil Company (NIOC). The Pars Oil and Gas Company, a subsidiary of NIOC, has jurisdiction over all South Pars-related projects. Field development has been delayed by various problems - technical (i.e., high levels of mercaptans and foul-smelling sulfur compounds), contractual issues and, recently, politics.

Gas production started from the field by commissioning phase 2 in December 2002 to produce  of wet gas. Gas is sent to shore via pipeline, and processed at Assaluyeh.

Gas production at South Pars rose by nearly 30% between March 2009 and March 2010.

Each of the phases is estimated to have an average capital spend of around US$1.5 billion, and most will be led by foreign oil firms working in partnership with local companies.

Development of a South Pars phase by the Norwegian Statoil company has become infamous after extensive report of misconduct and bribery to the Horton Investments, an Iranian consultancy firm owned by Mehdi Hashemi Rafsanjani, son of former Iranian President Hashemi Rafsanjani. Statoil committed to spending US$300 million to construct three production platforms and a pipeline. The government of Mr Ahmadinejad, who came to power in 2005, has favoured local firms over foreign companies in the energy and other sectors.

By the beginning of 2008, phases 1, 2, 3, 4 and 5 have been brought to production and by the end of 2008, phases 6, 7, 8, 9 and 10 will be on stream. Phases 12, 15, 16, 17, 18, 19, 27 and 28 are under different development stages.

Project finance

As of December 2010, about $30 billion have been invested in South Pars gas fields' development plan. It is estimated that the amount will reach over $40 billion by 2015. The Ministry of Petroleum in Iran said in a revised statement in 2011 that Iran will invest some $90 billion between 2011 and 2015 ($60 billion will be allocated to the upstream sector and the rest to the downstream sector).

Economic studies show with the operation of each South Pars phase, one percent is added to the country's gross domestic product (GDP), while phase 12 will add more than three percent of GDP.

South Pars phases

As at 2012, some 400 Iranian companies were taking part in the development of the South Pars gas field through supplying equipment to related projects.

It came online in March 2003.
Phases 6, 7 and 8 being developed by Petropars and Statoil to produce lean gas for re-injection into the Aghajari oilfield, and heavy gas and condensate for export. It involves construction of three offshore platforms in addition to the land based facilities. Statoil is developing the offshore platforms while Petropars is developing the land based facilities. A  pipe will be laid from each platform to the coast.
Phases 9 and 10 being developed by a joint venture of GS of South Korea, Oil Industries Engineering and Construction Company (OIEC Group) and Iranian Offshore Engineering and Construction Company (IOEC), in September 2002. The share of Iranian players in this contract exceeds 60%. Phases 9 & 10 were inaugurated by President Ahmadinejad in March 2009.
Phases 11 will produce LNG through the Pars LNG project. The project was awarded to China National Petroleum Corporation in 2010 after that France's Total S.A. was excluded from the project by Iran. Finally in December 2016, the memorandum of understanding for development of this phase has been awarded to a consortium of Total from France, CNPC from China and Petropars from Iran.
Phases 12 development begin carried out by Petropars as a LNG project. Venezuela’s state-owned oil company Petroleos de Venezuela S.A. (PDVSA) will finance 10% of the $7.8 billion project. Angola’s Sonangol Group has also been awarded a 20% stake in phase 12 project.
Phase 13 and 14 development will be for Persian LNG production. Development was awarded to an Iranian company (Khatam-ol-Osea) for $5 billion. The Iranian Khatam-ol-Osea Consortium is made up of several large Iranian companies, namely Khatam al-Anbia Construction Headquarters, Oil Industries Engineering & Construction (OIEC), SADRA, ISOICO, IDRO, and NIDC. The contract to develop phase 13 was signed with a consortium comprising Mapna, SADRA and Petro Pidar Iranian companies and the phase 14 with another consortia consisting of Industrial Development and Renovation Organization (IDRO), National Iranian Drilling Company (NIDC), Machine Sazi Arak (MSA) and Iranian Offshore Engineering and Construction Company (IOEC).
Phases 15 and 16 development was awarded to Khatam al-Anbia. In July 2010, the project was transferred to Iran Shipbuilding & Offshore Industries Complex. At that time, the $2 billion project was already 50% complete. Phase 15 & 16 will be completed by March 2012.
Phases 17 and 18 development was assigned to a consortium of Oil Industries Engineering and Construction Company (OIEC Group), Iran Offshore Engineering and Construction (IOEC) and Industrial Development and Renovation Organization of Iran (IDRO). Phases 17 & 18 were inaugurated by President Hassan Rouhani in April 2017.
Phase 19 development was awarded to Petropars. As it is understood this phase is defined within phase 1 so it can be regarded as some kind of expansion for phase 1.
Phases 20 and 21 development was awarded to OIEC Group.  per day of natural gas,  of ethane,  of natural gas condensate, 3,000 tons of LPG per day plus 400 tons of sulfur per day. Phases 20 & 21 were inaugurated by President Hassan Rouhani in April 2017. 
Phases 22, 23 and 24 were awarded to Khatam al-Anbia, Petro Sina Arian and SADRA and are located in the north-eastern frontier of the field. The three phases also are designed to produce 800,000 tons of LNG and 750,000 tons of ethane per year.
Phases 25 and 26 are in tender.
Phases 27 and 28 development was assigned to Petropars on an EPC scheme.

South Pars gas and condensate production plan

Table Sources: NIOC, Pars Oil & Gas Company, Shana and Media

Development delays and criticisms
While several phases of South Pars gas field are still waiting for development and the ongoing development phases are facing delays, NIOC authorities are conducting negotiations for development of other Iranian offshore gas fields like North Pars, Kish, Golshan, Ferdows and Lavan.

Many Iranian energy analysts believe that NIOC authorities should focus on full development of South Pars field prior to conduction of any new project for development of other undeveloped Iranian offshore gas fields.

The priority of South Pars full development is not only due to its shared nature with Qatar, but also with huge capability of the field to add significant liquid production to Iranian liquid export capacity.

On 27 February 2009, one of the members of Iranian Parliaments criticized lack of attention on the importance of acceleration of South Pars field development and the field development delays.

Scale and impacts of delays
By the end of 2008, Qatar's cumulative production from the field was two times higher than Iran's cumulative production from the field. The ratio is maintained mainly because Qatar's annual production is almost twice the Iranian production level.

The most important impact of delays and lower production in Iranian side would be migration of gas to the Qatari part and a loss of condensate yield due to decreased field pressure.

North Dome development
The North Dome, also known as North Field, was discovered in 1971, with the completion of Shell's North West Dome-1 well.

With falling oil and associated gas production, and depletion of the Khuff reserves, developing the North field became imperative. In 1984 it was decided that development would occur in phases. In 1989 a gas sweetening plant and sulfur processing unit were added. Phase one was online by early 1991. Gas from North Field phase one has been primarily used for local demand, and injection into the Dukhan field. Phase two was expected to involve selling North Field gas to its neighbors, possibly through a Gulf Cooperation Council (GCC) gas grid. Phase three involved exporting to Europe and Asia. Even before the Persian Gulf War, this phase ran into trouble. To justify the investment, QatarEnergy needed two large-scale long-term supply contracts. Despite efforts from QP managing director Jaber al-Marri, contracts were not forthcoming. This switched emphasis to domestic outlets. In 1988, a firm of international consultants presented a plan to QP for developing domestic projects to utilize Qatari gas. Suggestions included an aluminum smelter, a ferro-alloy production plant, methanol production facilities, and expansion of petrochemical and fertilizer operations.

Qatar rapidly expanded its production and exports from North Dome Field. Here are a number of milestones:

 1997: Qatar begins exporting by sending  (0.16 million tons) of LNG to Spain.
 2005: Qatar exports a total of  (27.9 million tons) of LNG.
 2006: Qatar surpasses Indonesia as the world's largest LNG exporter.
 2007: In March QatarEnergy solidifies its leading role when Qatargas completed its fifth LNG production train, giving the country  of annual liquefaction capacity, the most in the world.

Subsequent phases of the North field development provided feedstock to LNG plants at Ras Laffan Industrial City.

The prospects for further growth in Qatari gas production beyond 2012 are clouded by the uncertainty created by a moratorium on new export projects, which was imposed in 2005 while the effect of existing projects on North Field reservoirs was studied.

In order to monetize North Dome's vast resources of gas and liquids, Qatar has undertaken ambitious plans for establishment of the world's biggest LNG and GTL industry.

Qatar's LNG industry
Qatar's LNG company called Qatargas is located in the Ras Laffan Industrial Port on the coast of Persian Gulf.

Since 1997, Qatar has been exporting LNG from the North Field. In 2006, Qatar surpassed Indonesia as the world's largest LNG exporter. Based on the massive gas resources of the field, Qatar is developing the world biggest LNG export facilities in order to reach the capacity of 77 million metric ton per year by 2012 (see table below).

Qatargas is the main company responsible for Qatar's LNG projects.

Qatar's GTL industry

Oryx GTL (Sasol)

The ORYX GTL plant was commissioned in early 2007, as the first operational GTL plant in Qatar. Modifications recommended by Sasol assist with overcoming this shortfall and production capacity was reached/ maintained from 2009 onwards. The plant uses  of natural gas from the Al Khaleej Gas project. The ORYX GTL project uses Sasol's Slurry Phase Distillate (SPD) process.

Pearl GTL (Shell)

The first of two  GTL trains is planned to start production in 2011. Around  of natural gas will be supplied from the North field to the project. Shell has 100% of the equity in the integrated upstream and plant project.

Table 3. North Field production plan (million cubic feet per day).

Table sources: QatarGas, QatarEnergy and internet

See also

Aghajari Gas Injection Project
Dolphin Gas Project
Ferdowsi Gas Field
Golshan Gas Field
Kish Gas Field
NIOC Recent Discoveries
Pearl GTL
World Largest Gas Fields
Iran-Iraq-Syria pipeline
Qatar-Turkey pipeline
Helium (a quarter of the Earth's helium reserves is estimated to be in South Pars)

Notes

References
 Qatar: Country Analysis 2007 - Energy Information Administration - (Adobe Acrobat *.PDF document)
 Iran: Country Analysis 2006 - Energy Information Administration  - (Adobe Acrobat *.PDF document)
 Northern Qatar Arch Extension - Zagros Fold Belt Province - USGS - (Adobe Acrobat *.PDF document)
 World Energy Outlook 2005 - International Energy Agency - (Adobe Acrobat *.PDF document)
 Annual Report 2005 - QatarEnergy - (Adobe Acrobat *.PDF document)

External links

Iran–Qatar border
Natural gas fields in Iran
Natural gas fields in Qatar
Oil fields of Iran
Persian Gulf